Robert Nutter (c. 155026 July 1600) was an English Catholic priest, Dominican friar and martyr. He was beatified in 1987.

Life
Throughout the religious upheavals following the English Reformation, the vast majority of English Catholics, many of whom lived in Lancashire, remained staunchly loyal to the throne.

Nutter was born at Burnley, Lancashire. He entered Brasenose College, Oxford in 1564 or 1565, and, with his brother John Nutter, also a Catholic martyr, became a student of the English College, Reims. He was ordained at Soissons on 21 December 1581 along with Venerable William Dean and George Haydock.

Returning to England, he was committed to the Tower of London, along with his brother, also a priest, on 2 February 1584. He remained in the pit forty-seven days, wearing irons for forty-three days, and twice was subjected to the tortures of "the scavenger's daughter". On 10 November 1584, he was again consigned to the pit. Robert witnessed his older brother's execution before being released. The authorities believed he may unintentionally direct them to Catholic hiding places. He was again arrested and transported to France on 21 January 1585, with twenty other priests and one layman, aboard the Mary Martin of Colchester, from Tower Wharf.

Landing at Boulogne, 2 February, he revisited Rome in July, but, returned then to England as escort to newly ordained priests. When the party was brought ashore at Gravesend, Nutter gave his name as Rowley, but was recognised and on 30 November 1585 again committed to prison in London, this time to Newgate Prison. In 1587 he was removed to the Marshalsea Prison, and thence, in 1590, was sent to Wisbech Castle, Cambridgeshire. While in prison he joined the Dominican Order.

There, in 1597, he signed a petition to Father Henry Garnet in favour of having a Jesuit superior, but, on 8 November 1598, he and his fellow martyr, Edward Thwing, with others, besought the Pope to institute an archpriest. On 10 March 1600, the keeper having left the gate unlocked, Nutter and his companions made their escape. Some were never recaptured, but those who headed south were taken, and Nutter was sent to Lancaster, where he was executed on 26 July 1600.

Veneration
Robert Nutter was beatified by Pope John Paul II in 1987. It was said of Blessed Robert Nutter that, "[H]e was a man of a strong body but of a stronger soul, who rather despised and conquered death."

John Nutter
John Nutter attended St John's College, Cambridge. In 1578 the English College at Douai relocated temporarily to Rheims. John and his brother Robert arrived there in August the following year. John was ordained at Laon in September 1582 and left for Yorkshire in November. However, gale winds blew toward the Suffolk coast. John Nutter had contracted an illness before sailing and as it grew worse, he ferried ashore at Dunwich. The ship was subsequently driven on a sandbank and men of the town searched it for anything salvageable. A bundle of Catholic books were found. The ill Nutter was questioned at the inn where he had been taken and acknowledged that he was a priest. He was arrested and taken to the Marshalsea. He remained there a year before being tried and condemned, and shortly thereafter executed at Tyburn, along with James Fenn, George Haydock, Thomas Hemerford, and John Munden.

See also
 Douai Martyrs

References

Year of birth uncertain
1550 births
1600 deaths
People from Burnley
English Dominicans
Alumni of Brasenose College, Oxford
English College, Reims alumni
16th-century Roman Catholic martyrs
Eighty-five martyrs of England and Wales
People executed under Elizabeth I
Executed people from Lancashire